The 2010 Summer Youth Olympics were held in Singapore from 14 to 26 August 2010. A total of 3,600 athletes from 204 National Olympic Committees (NOCs) participated in 201 events in 26 sports. Events took place at eighteen competition venues, of which eleven were pre-existing venues, one was newly constructed for the Olympics, and six were temporary venues that would be removed following the Games. Another twelve venues were set aside for training purposes. The Youth Olympic Village was a separate non-competitive venue that provided accommodation and activities for the athletes.

The Singapore Youth Olympic Games Organising Committee (SYOGOC) organised the Games, which the city-state of Singapore won the bid to host on 21 February 2008. The Singapore Turf Club Riding Centre was the only venue constructed for the Games. Certain venues such as the Singapore Indoor Stadium and The Float@Marina Bay were temporarily converted to host certain sports and events, while the Kallang Field was upgraded to be able to host the archery competition.

The Float@Marina Bay, the world's largest floating stage, was the main venue for the Games, hosting the opening and closing ceremonies. It was also the largest venue in terms of seating capacity at the Games, capable of holding 25,000 spectators. The 55,000-seater National Stadium was not used as it was undergoing demolition to make way for the Singapore Sports Hub expected to open after the Games. Discounting venues which do not have spectator seating such as the National Sailing Centre, the smallest venue in terms of seating capacity was the Kallang Field which could hold 500.



Competition venues

Training venues 
All training venues listed here existed before the Youth Olympics. Sports which are not listed had their training at the respective competition venues.

Youth Olympic Village 
The Youth Olympic Village (YOV) of the Games housed over 5,000 athletes and team officials from 10 to 28 August 2010. Located in Nanyang Technological University (NTU), it was divided into two zones: the Residential Zone and the Village Square. The Residential Zone consisted of NTU's ten Halls of Residence, namely Halls 3 and 8 to 16. While two of the halls (Halls 3 and 16) were recently completed, most were existing halls with students who were forced to move out temporarily to make way for the event. The Village Square covered the entirety of the existing National Institute of Education campus and included the Event Information Centre, the Culture and Education Programme Plaza (with World Culture Village booths, evening festivals, the Olympic gallery, art installations, the health zone, the career corridor, etc), the main dining hall and retail outlets.

The YOV served as accommodation and a preparation point for the Games, and it also hosted specially designed cultural and educational activities for the athletes. On 7 June 2010, it was announced that Parliamentary Secretary and SYOGOC advisor Teo Ser Luck, former national sprinter Canagasabai Kunalan and former national swimmer Joscelin Yeo were appointed as the Village Mayor and Deputy Village Mayors respectively.

The International Olympic Committee (IOC) specified that all members of a National Olympic Committee team delegation had to stay overnight within the Youth Olympic Village for the duration of the Games, regardless of their competition schedules, "and shall participate in both sports competitions and in the culture and education programmes." IOC president Jacques Rogge stressed the need for athletes to enjoy their time at the Games and that "there should not be a gravity that you have at the traditional Games  that's for later." The senior Olympic Games in contrast allow athletes and teams to leave the Games once their competition schedule has ended.

Initial plans were for the YOV to be sited at the National University of Singapore's University Town, which was under construction. However, rising construction costs worldwide as cited by the SYOGOC prompted a shift to NTU. The new US$423 million (S$598 million) construction project at NTU commenced work in 2008 and was completed in  2010. The Straits Times announced in July 2010 that hydrogen-electric hybrid buses would be used to ferry participants around the YOV, being among the first green buses to be used in Singapore. A sculpture, titled The Wind and Wings, was specially made to commemorate the world's first Youth Olympic Village. It was unveiled by President of Singapore S. R. Nathan on 1 August 2010. The sculpture is made up of three tonnes of stainless steel and was sculpted by artist Yeo Chee Kiong.

Notes 
1. Although the Singapore 2010 official website listed the number of National Olympic Committees (NOCs) participating at 205 (all NOCs that exist as of 2010), the Kuwait Olympic Committee was in fact banned in January and was thus not allowed to participate.
2. *scape is a public space in the downtown of Singapore dedicated to youth and their activities.

References

External links

Competition Venues – Singapore 2010 official site
Opening & Closing Ceremonies at The Float@Marina Bay – Singapore 2010 official site
 – Singapore 2010 official site

 
2010 Summer Youth Olympics
2010 Summer Youth Olympics
Lists of buildings and structures in Singapore
Singapore sport-related lists